Hyperthaema elysiusa is a moth of the subfamily Arctiinae. It was described by Schaus in 1933. It is found in Ecuador.

References

Phaegopterina
Moths described in 1933